This is a list of ambassadors of the United States to Austria.

The United States first established diplomatic relations with Austria in 1838 during the time of the Austrian Empire. Relations between the United States have been continuous since that time except for two interruptions during World War I and World War II.

The first ambassadors were accredited to the Austrian Empire. In 1867 the empire became Austria-Hungary and the ambassadors were so commissioned. After the resumption of diplomatic relations following World War I, the ambassadors were commissioned to Austria.

For ambassadors to Hungary after the dissolution of the empire, see United States Ambassador to Hungary.

The United States Embassy in Austria is located in Vienna.

Ambassadors

See also
 Austria – United States relations
 Austrian Ambassador to the United States
 Embassy of the United States, Vienna
 Foreign relations of Austria

Notes

References
 United States Department of State: Background notes on Austria

External links
 United States Department of State: Chiefs of Mission for Austria
 United States Department of State: Austria
 United States Embassy in Vienna

Lists of ambassadors of the United States
United States